Braaid is a hamlet in the parish of Marown on the Isle of Man, about 6 km west of the capital Douglas. It is best known for the nearby ancient settlement of The Braaid.

General description 
The hamlet is centred on the crossroads of the A24 Foxdale to Douglas road and the A26 Ballasalla to Glen Vine road. The hamlet consists of a main concentration of houses around this crossroads and some other farms and dwellings which surround it.

The Braaid Hall 
The Braaid Hall has provided a centre for the community since 1937, when it was founded as the Braaid Young Mens Club. It is now mainly used to hold Eisteddfods, sports days, jumble sales and other events for the local community.

The Braaid Eisteddfod 
The Braaid Eisteddfod is an annual musical and literary festival that started in the 1950s.

References

Villages in the Isle of Man